Małgorzata Wysocka (born 15 June 1979) is a road cyclist from Poland. She represented her nation at the 2004 Summer Olympics. She also rode at the 1998, 2001, 2003 and 2004 UCI Road World Championships.

References

External links
 profile at Procyclingstats.com

1979 births
Polish female cyclists
Living people
Sportspeople from Lublin
Cyclists at the 2004 Summer Olympics
Olympic cyclists of Poland